McDonald House or McDonald Farm or variations may refer to:

Locations

United States

Arkansas
McDonald–Wait–Newton House, Little Rock, Arkansas, listed on the NRHP in Little Rock, Arkansas
D. McDonald House, Smackover, Arkansas, listed on the NRHP in Union County, Arkansas
Emmett McDonald House, McRae, Arkansas, listed on the NRHP in White County, Arkansas

California
McDonald Mansion, also known as "Mabelton", Santa Rosa, California, listed on the NRHP in Sonoma County, California

Iowa
McDonald House (Winterset, Iowa), listed on the NRHP in Madison County, Iowa

Kentucky
Nash–McDonald House, Anchorage, Kentucky, NRHP-listed

Louisiana
McDonald House (Minden, Louisiana), listed on the NRHP in Webster Parish, Louisiana

Nebraska
Old McDonald Farm, Blair, Nebraska, listed on the NRHP in Washington County, Nebraska
J.D. McDonald House, Fremont, Nebraska, listed on the NRHP in Dodge County, Nebraska

Nevada
Irving McDonald House, Tonopah, Nevada, listed on the NRHP in Nye County, Nevada

New Mexico
Austin–McDonald House, Aztec, New Mexico, listed on the NRHP in San Juan County, New Mexico

Ohio
McDonald Farm (Xenia, Ohio), listed on the NRHP in Greene County, Ohio

South Dakota
Henry M. McDonald House, Pierre, South Dakota, listed on the NRHP in Hughes County, South Dakota

Tennessee
McDonald–Bolner House, Fayetteville, Tennessee, listed on the NRHP in Lincoln County, Tennessee

Texas
McDonald Hall, Abilene, Texas, listed on the NRHP in Taylor County, Texas
McKinney–McDonald House, Galveston, Texas, listed on the NRHP in Galveston County, Texas
McDonald House (Houston, Texas), listed on the NRHP in Harris County, Texas
Pace McDonald Site, Palestine, Texas, listed on the NRHP in Anderson County, Texas
McDonald House (Victoria, Texas), listed on the NRHP in Victoria County, Texas

Utah
David McDonald House, Salt Lake City, Utah, listed on the NRHP in Salt Lake County, Utah

Virginia
Joseph McDonald Farm, Prices Fork, Virginia, listed on the NRHP in Montgomery County, Virginia
Bryan McDonald Jr. House, Troutville, Virginia, listed on the NRHP in Botetourt County, Virginia

West Virginia
Lee–Throckmorton–McDonald House, Inwood, West Virginia, NRHP-listed

Elsewhere 
MacDonald House, Singapore
Site of the MacDonald House bombing
Macdonald House, London, former Canadian consular building in London
Macdonald House, a historical home museum in Winnipeg, Canada, also known as Dalnavert

Other 
Ronald McDonald House Charities
 Ronald McDonald House New York
New MacDonald's Farm, an Australian children's television program

See also
"Old MacDonald Had a Farm", children's song